Events from the year 1875 in China.

Incumbents
 Tongzhi Emperor (15th year)
 Regent: Empress Dowager Cixi
 Guangxu Emperor (1st year)

Events
 Tongzhi Emperor dies without an heir, Empress Dowager Cixi selects her three-year-old nephew Zaitian as the Guangxu Emperor to succeed him
 Dungan Revolt (1862–77)
 February 21 — Margary Affair British explorer Augustus Raymond Margary and his entire staff murdered in Yunnan
 60 to 70 Christian women in Amoy attended a meeting presided by a missionary John MacGowan formed the Heavenly Foot Society (tianzu literally meaning Heavenly Foot), opposing the practice of footbinding
 American trading company Augustine Heard & Co. becomes bankrupt

Births 

 Gao Enhong
 Wang Shoupeng
 Rong Desheng
 Yu Baoxuan
 Du Xigui
 Lin Xu

Deaths 

 Empress Xiaozheyi
 Ding Yan
 12 January — Tongzhi Emperor

References